Nikola Nestorovic (15 April 1868 Požarevac - 18 February 1957, Belgrade) was a Serbian architect and professor at the Technical Faculty.

After finishing grade school, he moved to Belgrade, where he enrolled in the Technical College of the Great School. He graduated in 1890, and was employed as a subcontractor at the Ministry of Construction. He was sent back to work in Požarevac.

Significant works 
 National Museum of Serbia with Andra Stevanovic 
 House of N. Nestorovic - Kneza Milosa 40
 House of V. Markovic - Terazije 38, with Andra Stevanovic
 Belgrade Cooperative - Karadjordjeva 48 with Andra Stevanovic 
 Building of Merchant Stamenković corner of Kralja Petra and Uzun-Mirkova with Andra Stevanovic 
 Hotel Bristol, Belgrade corner of Karadjordjeva and Hercegovacka

Gallery

See also
 List of Serbian architects

References

Literature 
 Дивна Ђурић-Замоло; Градитељи Београда 1815-1914
 Arhitektura Srbije u XIX Veku, Bogdan Nestorovic

1868 births
1957 deaths
Serbian architects
People from Požarevac